Swak na Swak, formerly known as Kabuhayang Swak na Swak (Perfectly Fit Business), is an entrepreneurial and informative show produced by Bayan Productions which was aired weekend mornings on ABS-CBN and worldwide via The Filipino Channel. It premiered on August 22, 2006, with Amy Perez and Chase Tinio as the show's original hosts. The program features ways, means and techniques of how to start, set up and maintain a certain business. The show aired every Saturday and Sunday at 7:00 a.m. (PST) except for some ABS-CBN Regional stations, where it was broadcast at an earlier time of 5:30 a.m. to make room for locally produced ABS-CBN Regional news programs like the Saturday editions of Maayong Buntag Kapamilya, Panay Sikat, and Maayong Buntag Mindanao.

From May 3, 2020, the show has been temporarily suspended airings due to the temporary closure of ABS-CBN because of the cease and desist order of the National Telecommunications Commission (NTC), following the expiration of the network's 25-year franchise granted in 1995. It was carried over by Kapamilya Channel when it was launched a month after.

On April 25, 2021, ANC ended its simulcast for Swak na Swak, and ANCX programming took its place on May 2, 2021.

The show concluded on September 26, 2021, after 15 years of airing and the temporary closure of Bayan Productions, and was replaced the following week by a replay of earlier seasons of G Diaries.

Hosts
Final
 Bobby Yan (2011-2021)
 Ahmir Sinsuat (2017-2021)
 Shah Sinsuat-Hermoso (2017-2021)
 Ethan Salvador (2017-2021)
Former
 Dimples Romana (2011-2020)
 Aly Sevilla (2017)
 Carlos Agassi (2013–2014)
 Amy Perez (2006–2010)
 Chase Tinio (2006–2007)
 Christine Bersola-Babao (2010–2011)
 Donita Rose (2006–2010)
 Eileen Shi (2018)
 Franzen Fajardo (2006–2011)
 Gilbert Remulla (2008–2011)
 Katherine de Castro (2006–2011)
 Jason Gainza (2006–2011)
 Louie Ngo (2017)
 Roxanne Barcelo (2010–2016)
 Shawn Kyle (2017)
 Markus Paterson (2017)
 Maxine Medina (2019)
 Uma Khouny (2006–2007)
 Cherie Mercado (2008)

See also
 List of programs broadcast by ABS-CBN

Business-related television series
Philippine television shows
ABS-CBN original programming
ABS-CBN News and Current Affairs shows
2006 Philippine television series debuts
2021 Philippine television series endings
Filipino-language television shows
Television series by Bayan Productions